The Treaty of Bucharest was signed by Serbia and Bulgaria on  in Bucharest (capital of Romania), marking the end of the Serbo-Bulgarian War. The treaty contained a single article, stating that peace between the two countries was restored. The treaty paved the way for the political imperative whereby only the Bulgarian prince could be a governor of Eastern Rumelia.

See also
Tophane Agreement
List of treaties

References 

History of Bucharest
1886 treaties
1886 in Bulgaria
1886 in Serbia
Bucharest
Bucharest
Treaties of the Principality of Bulgaria
Bucharest
Serbo-Bulgarian War
March 1886 events